Nuy (also Romanized as Nūy; also known as Nū'ī) is a village in Margavar Rural District, Silvaneh District, Urmia County, West Azerbaijan Province, Iran. At the 2006 census, its population was 610, in 104 families.

References 

Populated places in Urmia County